Arosvallen is a multi-use stadium in Västerås, Sweden.  It is mostly used for soccer, though it is also the home stadium for the Division 1 American football team Västerås Roedeers.

The stadium hosted two 1958 FIFA World Cup games, Yugoslavia - Scotland and Yugoslavia - France. It also hosted four group matches, a quarterfinal, and a semifinal in the 1995 FIFA Women's World Cup.

On 18 February 1934, Arosvallen set an attendance record for the Swedish men's top bandy division, with 11,231 spectators watching Västerås SK–IFK Uppsala (1–5).

References

Football venues in Sweden
1958 FIFA World Cup stadiums
1995 FIFA Women's World Cup stadiums
Sport in Västerås
Sports venues completed in 1931
1931 establishments in Sweden